The remains of Swedish victim of prostitution Catrine da Costa (19 June 1956 – c. July  1984) were found in Solna, north of Stockholm, in 1984. Da Costa had been dismembered, and parts of her body were found in plastic bags on 18 July and 7 August. The case is known as styckmordsrättegången ('the dismemberment murder trial'). How da Costa died has not been established as her vital organs and head have never been found.

Background 
Da Costa, who was prostituted in Stockholm in early 1984, disappeared during Pentecost on 10 June, or soon thereafter. On 18 July, the first parts of her dismembered body were discovered under a highway overpass in Solna, just outside Stockholm; additional body parts were discovered elsewhere on 7 August. Da Costa's body was identified by her fingerprints. Her head, internal organs, one breast and genitalia have never been found, and no cause of death could be determined from what was found.

Shortly thereafter, Teet Härm, a pathologist in a forensics laboratory at Karolinska Institutet, was suspected of the crime. He was known to meet sex workers, and his workplace was between the two places where the victim's body was found. He was arrested and released.

At this time, the wife of Thomas Allgén, a general practitioner, alerted the police that their 17-month-old daughter might be an incest victim. Pediatric examinations found no evidence of abuse, and the doctor and his wife separated in late 1984. Later in 1985, the wife told police that her daughter had begun talking about witnessing a dismemberment. Since the pathologist and the general practitioner knew each other superficially, the police connected the cases. The following trials also contained testimonies from the then-2½-year-old child's stories, interpreted by her mother and evaluated by a child psychologist and child psychiatrist.

In 1986, police resources were stretched thin after the murder of Swedish Prime Minister Olof Palme, and the dismemberment case was shelved until the following year. Härm and Allgén were arrested in late 1987 and brought to trial in January 1988.

Trials 
The first trial ended in a mistrial after the lay judges were interviewed for the newspaper Aftonbladet on 9 March 1988 and commented on the court's justification for its judicial decision. In a second trial, the lower court asked the Swedish National Board of Health and Welfare to investigate the circumstances of the case and found that da Costa's cause of death was unknown. As a result, the two defendants were acquitted, since it could not be established that da Costa died under suspicious circumstances. Although in its verdict the court found that the defendants had dismembered the victim's body, the statute of limitations for that crime had expired.

On 23 May 1989, the Swedish authority for medical-negligence assessment rescinded the doctors' right to work, and its ruling was upheld in a 1991 appeal. The doctors have appealed to several courts, including the Supreme Court of Sweden, the Supreme Administrative Court of Sweden (Regeringsrätten) and the European Court of Human Rights, none of which have overturned the ruling.

Aftermath 
The case has been the focus of several books, investigative articles and television documentaries. Author Hanna Olsson published the book Cathrine och rättvisan (Cathrine and the Justice) in 1990, highlighting the patriarchal nature of the justice system and how women in prostitution were not seen as reliable witnesses. Journalist Per Lindeberg published Döden är en man (Death is a Man) in 1999, questioning the police investigation and contending that the men were victims of a miscarriage of justice caused partially by extensive media coverage. In 2003 journalist Lars Borgnäs published Sanningen är en sällsynt gäst (Truth is a Rare Guest), opposing Lindeberg's position and theorizing that da Costa was murdered by a serial killer.

In 2006, the doctors demanded 40 million kronor (about US$4.8 million) in damages for loss of income during the years they could not practice and for defamation. Their demand was refused when the Chancellor of Justice, who handles questions of voluntary damages, ruled that such a large claim should be handled by the courts.

On 3 April 2007, the two men's attorney registered their claim for 35 million kronor in damages at the Attunda lower court. On 30 November 2009, the trial of the Swedish state began, ending shortly before Christmas. In an 18 February 2010 judgement, the court ruled that the doctors were not entitled to damages.

Da Costa's murder has inspired multiple works of fiction, such as Stieg Larsson's internationally successful crime novel The Girl with the Dragon Tattoo and work by Katarina Frostenson and Sara Stridsberg.  The statute of limitations for the killing expired in 2009 and prosecutors suspended their investigations on 1 July that year.

See also 
List of solved missing person cases
List of unsolved murders

References

Further reading

External links 

Per Lindeberg's web site Mediemordet.com

1984 murders in Sweden
Crimes against sex workers
Formerly missing people
Incidents of violence against women
July 1984 events in Europe
Missing person cases in Sweden
Unsolved murders in Sweden
Femicide in Sweden